Elaiochori (Greek: Ελαιοχώρι ) is a mountain village in Arcadia, Greece. It lies near the border of Argolis. It was historically called Masklina (Greek: Μάσκλινα ), a Slavic name meaning "olives". The Korinth-Kalamata railway runs through the village. Elaiochori has a population of 394 (2011 census) and is part of the municipal unit of Korythio. Its name comes from its considerable production of olives and olive oil.

References

Populated places in Arcadia, Peloponnese